Javier Lozano Cid (born 28 October 1960) is a Spanish former futsal player and World Cup champion two times as a manager. He is currently  the president of the LNFS.

Career

He has managed the Spain national futsal team.

Coaching achievements
Five tournaments "Four Nations" (1993, 1994,1995, 1997 and 1998)
Third place - World Futsal Championship - Hong Kong 1992
UEFA European Tournament Winner - Cordoba, Spain 1996
Second place - World Futsal Championship - Spain 1996
Tiger's FIFA Tournament Winner - Singapore 1997
World Futsal Championship Winner - Guatemala 2000
European Championship Winner - Moscow, Russia 2001
Tiger's FIFA Tournament Winner - Singapore 2001
Third place - European Championship - Caserta, Italy 2003
World Futsal Championship Winner - Chinese Taipei 2004
European Championship Winner - Ostrava, Czech Republic 2005

References

External links
Lozano at futsalplanet

1960 births
Living people
Sportspeople from Toledo, Spain
Spanish men's futsal players
Futsal coaches